Joan Martí Viñolas (9 January 1887 – 17 September 1978) was a Catalan cyclist. He won the third edition of the Volta a Catalunya in 1913 and the Spanish National Road Race Championships the same year. However, his career was cut short not long after due to the start of World War I.

Major results
1913
 1st  Overall Volta a Catalunya
1st Stage 1
 1st  Road race, National Road Championships
 1st Overall Vuelta al País Vasco y Navarra
1st Stage 4

References

External links

1887 births
1978 deaths
Spanish male cyclists
Cyclists from Catalonia
20th-century Spanish people